Mordasovo is a rural locality (a village) in Golovinskoye Rural Settlement, Sudogodsky District, Vladimir Oblast, Russia. The population was 6 as of 2010.

Geography 
Mordasovo is located on the Vysokusha River, 21 km west of Sudogda (the district's administrative centre) by road. Alexandrovo is the nearest rural locality.

References 

Rural localities in Sudogodsky District